Abd ol Maleki (also Romanized as ‘Abd ol Malekī) is a village in Khezel-e Sharqi Rural District, Khezel District, Nahavand County, Hamadan Province, Iran. At the 2006 census, its population was 1,021, in 236 families.

References 

Populated places in Nahavand County